Carlos Humberto Rodríguez Quirós (April 21, 1910 – July 23, 1986) was a Costa Rican priest of the Catholic Church.  Originally a Carthusian monk in Europe, he left that order and returned to Costa Rica, where he was named Archbishop of San José in 1960.  He was relieved by the Vatican of the administration of the archdiocese in 1978, and he resigned in 1979.

References 

1910 births
1986 deaths
Carthusians
20th-century Roman Catholic bishops in Costa Rica
Roman Catholic archbishops of San José de Costa Rica